Fort Ruger is a fort on the island of Oahu that served as the first military reservation in the Territory of Hawaii. Named after Civil War General Thomas H. Ruger and built in and around Diamond Head Crater, the fort was established by the United States for the purpose of defending the harbor of its newly annexed territory.  The fort was established in 1906 as Diamond Head Reservation and renamed Fort Ruger in 1909.

History
Fort Ruger was the site of Battery Harlow, armed with eight 12-inch mortars. The fort's prominent location on Diamond Head made it a natural fire control station, with several posts built into Lēʻahi Peak.

The Fort is listed on the National Register of Historic Places, with portions of the site still being used for training by the Hawaii National Guard.

Few of the original buildings survive. The most striking are three sets of stone structures that mark former gates to the fort. On the Waikiki side, there is a pair of gateposts on either side of the sidewalk and a square stone bunker across the street with a gun slit in the outside wall and with crenels and merlons along the top, as if it were a battlement in a European castle. On the Kahala side is a larger stone gatehouse with rounded edges of the kind popular in the 1930s. Between them, on the Kaimuki side, is a purely decorative structure, a circular stonewalled planter with two jagged stone arches intersecting at 90-degree angles. It now stands at the edge of the Kapiolani Community College parking lot, but was once flanked by two large gun barrels.

Images

See also
 16th Coast Artillery (United States)
 64th Coast Artillery (United States)

References

Coastal artillery
Ruger
Buildings and structures in Honolulu
Territory of Hawaii
Ruger
1906 establishments in Hawaii
Protected areas established in 1983
Historic districts on the National Register of Historic Places in Hawaii
National Register of Historic Places in Honolulu